Baars is a Dutch language patronymic or toponymic surname. Notable people with the surname include:

:de:Ab Baars (born 1955), Dutch jazz saxophonist and clarinettist
Bernard Baars (born 1946), Dutch-born American neuroscientist
Conrad Baars (1919–1981), Dutch psychiatrist
Hans Baars-Lindner (1925–2014), German competitive sailor
Henk Baars (born 1960), Dutch cyclist
Herman Baars (1822–1896), Norwegian governmental official
Jan Baars (1903–1989), Dutch fascist politician and World War II resistance member
Jorina Baars
Lara Baars (born 1996), Dutch Paralympic athlete

See also
Baars, Overijssel, a village in Netherlands

Dutch-language surnames
Patronymic surnames